Presidential elections were held in Egypt on 4 October 1993. The vote took the form of a referendum on the candidacy of Hosni Mubarak after he was nominated for the post by a 439–9 vote in the People's Assembly on 21 July. His candidacy for a third consecutive six-year term was approved by 96.3% of voters, with a turnout of 84.2%.

Results

References

Egypt
President
Egypt
Presidential elections in Egypt
Referendums in Egypt
Single-candidate elections